This is a list of educational institutions located in Belgrade, Serbia.

Higher education
 University of Belgrade
 University of Arts
 University of Defence
 Singidunum University
 Megatrend University
 Union University
 Institute of Political Studies in Belgrade
 Braća Karić University
 European University in Belgrade

Secondary education
Gymnasiums in Belgrade:

Primary education

References

External links

 
Belgrade
Education
Educational institutions
Belgrade
Belgrade